Devinagar  is a village development committee in Palpa District in Lumbini Province of southern Nepal. At the time of the 1991 Nepal census it had a population of 3280 people living in 541 individual households.

References

Populated places in Palpa District